The Rosa Parks Hempstead Transit Center is the Nassau Inter-County Express bus system's indoor customer facility between Jackson and West Columbia Streets in Hempstead, New York. Directly across West Columbia Street is also the terminus for the Hempstead Branch of the Long Island Rail Road. Serving 19 routes, the bus transit center is the major transfer point for customers using a second Nassau Inter-County Express route or the LIRR. It offers a waiting area, transit information, MetroCard vending machines, a newsstand and restrooms. As of 2015, the LIRR schedules 28 departures and 28 arrivals here on weekdays.

History

Rail terminal
The Hempstead Long Island Railroad station was originally built as a Central Railroad of Long Island depot sometime between October and December 1872, on the corner of Main Street and Fulton Avenue. When the Long Island Rail Road acquired the CRRLI in 1878, this Hempstead Station and terminus came with it, replacing the former 1839-built Hempstead Station, which ran along the original Hempstead Branch, and was located on Main Street and Centre Street.

The station was remodeled in July 1881, and razed in 1913. A second brick station was built in February 1913, which was designed to have trains terminate behind the building rather than alongside of it. This was due to an accident from January 1912 involving a milk train that rear-ended a stationary passenger car, sending it across Fulton Avenue and crashing into a building across the street and resulting in two deaths. Between December 30, 1941 and 1943, service was suspended when the tracks were cut back and the station was moved to Columbia Street. Upon the completion of this move and track work, the second station was opened again. However it was gutted in a fire on December 31, 1962 and remodeled in April 1963. This station was razed in 1998 and replaced with a much more elaborate third depot which was built between 1999 and 2002.

Bus terminal
In 1993, construction on the Hempstead Transit Center was completed and it was opened to the public. In conjunction with the new railroad station, its construction was part of a plan by Mayor James A. Garner to redevelop Hempstead and help bring it back to prominence as "Long Island's hub". The original Hempstead bus terminal was located across Jackson Street on the corner of Jackson and Main streets. That area is now occupied by the Greyhound bus stop and various businesses. The new transit center can accommodate many more buses than the original terminal and allows almost half of the Nassau Inter-County Express (formerly MTA Long Island Bus) system's routes to run through Hempstead. Although Hempstead has never reached its former level of prominence, the new terminal and railroad station, along with the establishment of many new businesses, have helped to reestablish Hempstead as the hub of Long Island.

Naming
On February 14, 2006, then-Nassau County Executive, Thomas Suozzi announced that Hempstead Transit Center would be renamed in honor of civil rights pioneer Rosa Parks. At the dedication, Suozzi said, "To honor her memory and that of her important work, today we are renaming this vital transit hub for one of the most important figures in American history.” In addition to the renaming of the terminal, a permanent exhibit of the civil rights movement will be constructed, telling the story of the struggle for equality through the photographs of photojournalists and artists who covered the unrest of that era, including the late Moneta Sleet Jr., Jim Peppler (a photographer for Long Island's local newspaper, Newsday), and Herbert Randall. So far, a column in the back of the bus terminal has been renovated with black marble, engraved with a large image of Rosa Parks and her story below.

Station layout
This station has two high-level island platforms, each 8 cars long. The Hempstead Branch has eight tracks at this location. The four tracks to the east of the platforms but not adjacent to them are used for train storage.

Bus connections

At the Hempstead Transit Center, there are 19 routes operating through the terminal. Also, weekend Jones Beach n88 trips stop outside at Columbia Avenue. Departure assignments during the day are listed below, during late night hours when the terminal is closed, all buses stop on West Columbia Street at Station Plaza immediately north of the terminal.

Gallery

References

External links

Hempstead Station History (Arrt's Arrchives)
NICE Bus links
Station House from Google Maps Street View (Interior)
Platforms from Google Maps Street View
South end of the platforms & tracks/ Exterior of the Station House from Google Maps Street View
Overpass from Google Maps Street View
West Side of the Bus Terminal's loading/drop off area from Google Maps Street View

Hempstead (village), New York
Bus stations in New York (state)
Railway stations in the United States opened in 1872
Transit centers in the United States
Long Island Rail Road stations in Nassau County, New York
Memorials to Rosa Parks
1872 establishments in New York (state)